Thermoanaerobacter kivui (formerly Acetogenium kivui) is a thermophilic, anaerobic, nonspore-forming species of bacteria.

T. kivui was originally isolated from Lake Kivu in Africa. The growth range for the organism is 50 to 72°C at pH 5.3-7.3, with optimal growth conditions at 66°C and pH 6.4. Although the organism stains Gram-negative, it shows a Gram-positive cell structure. The original genus Acetogenium was named because this organism principally produces acetic acid from substrates. T. kivui was originally named Acetogenium kivui, which was the only species within a new genus. However, further 16S ribosomal RNA studies put this bacterium into genus Thermoanaerobacter and the previous genus was no longer necessary.

References

External links
Type strain of Thermoanaerobacter kivui at BacDive -  the Bacterial Diversity Metadatabase

Thermoanaerobacterales
Thermophiles
Anaerobes
Bacteria described in 1983